Secret City may refer to:
 Secret City (book), a book by Gunnar S. Paulsson
 Secret City (TV series), a 2016 Australian television mini-series
 Secret City Records, a Canadian independent record label
 Long Tieng or Secret City, a Laotian military base
 Oak Ridge, Tennessee or the Secret City

See also
 Closed city, a settlement with travel and residency restrictions in the Soviet Union
 Secret Cities, an American rock band
 The Secret City Adventures, a children's television program
 Secret City Saga, a collection of comic book titles